Tapinoma christophi is a species of ant in the genus Tapinoma. Described by Emery in 1925, the species is endemic to Lebanon and the Russian Federation.

References

Tapinoma
Hymenoptera of Asia
Hymenoptera of Europe
Insects described in 1925